The 1914 Argentine Primera División was the 23rd season of top-flight football in Argentina. Racing won the official AFA tournament, while Porteño won the dissident FAF championship, the last tournament before both leagues, AFA and FAF reunified.

The AFA season began on Marzo 29 and ended on December? while the FAF season began on April 5 and ended on December?.

Final tables

Asociación Argentina de Football – Copa Campeonato

Huracán made its debut in Primera División, while Ferrocarril Sud was dissolved after playing 7 matches.

Federación Argentina de Football

Tigre was ejected from the Federation after playing 14 matches while Argentino de Quilmes was disaffiliated after playing 7 games. According to the rules, Floresta had to be relegated but it finally remained in Primera due to the reunification of both leagues Asociación Argentina and Federación Argentina.

References

Argentine Primera División seasons
1914 in Argentine football
1914 in South American football